Anemarrhena is a plant genus in family Asparagaceae, subfamily Agavoideae. It has only one species, Anemarrhena  asphodeloides, native to China and Mongolia. Some authors have placed it in its own family, Anemarrhenaceae.

Distribution 
The plant is native to China and Mongolia, occurring in the western half of China, from Yunnan to Northeast China. It is introduced into Taiwan and Korea.

Traditional medicine
The plant name in China is zhi mu (知母, zhī mǔ) and its rhizome is used in traditional Chinese medicine.

References

External links

Anemarrhena asphodeloides Bge. Medicinal Plant Images Database (School of Chinese Medicine, Hong Kong Baptist University)  
知母, Common Anemarrhena Rhizome, Zhi Mu Chinese Medicine Specimen Database (School of Chinese Medicine, Hong Kong Baptist University)  

Agavoideae
Flora of China
Flora of Korea
Flora of Mongolia
Taxa named by Alexander von Bunge